Ghuraifa is a village in Bahrain that has now been subsumed into the Juffair suburb of Manama, Bahrain. Its Bahraini inhabitants are Baharna Shia.

The village and its descendants have produced a number of prominent Twelver clerics, including:
 Grand Ayatollah Allaedin Ghoraifi of Najaf
 Senior Bahraini cleric Abdullah al Ghuraifi
 Kamaleddin Ghuraifi, the assassinated representative of Ayatollah Sistani in Baghdad.

The village lies west of the United States Naval Support Activity Bahrain base, and south of the Bahrain School.

References 

Neighborhoods of Manama